Atractophaedusa is a genus of gastropods belonging to the family Clausiliidae. The species of this genus are found in South-eastern Asia.

Species
The following species are recognised in the genus Atractophaedusa:

Atractophaedusa antibouddah 
Atractophaedusa kebavica 
Atractophaedusa ookuboi 
Atractophaedusa pyknosoma 
Atractophaedusa rhopaloides 
Atractophaedusa smithi  
Atractophaedusa takagii

References

Clausiliidae